Events from the year 1923 in Sweden

Incumbents
 Monarch – Gustaf V
 Prime Minister – Hjalmar Branting, Ernst Trygger

Events

 8 May – 30 September – The Liseberg amusement park opens in Gothenburg, Sweden, as part of the Gothenburg Tercentennial Jubilee Exposition.
 The Equal Competence Law, granting men and women equal rights to all public positions and professions, is passed in Sweden.

Births
 5 June – Bertil Haase, modern pentathlete (died 2014).
 25 July – Maria Gripe, writer (died 2007).
 13 October – Viking Palm, wrestler (died 2009).
 20 November – Gunnar Åkerlund, canoer (died 2006).
 30 December – Carl-Göran Ekerwald, novelist, essayist, literary critic and teacher.

Deaths

 19 January - Amalia Eriksson, businesswoman (born 1824)
 20 March - Louise Flodin, journalist (born 1828)
 8 November - Alfhild Agrell, writer (born 1849)
 7 December - Clementine Swartz, actress (born 1835)
 11 December - Kata Dalström, politician (born 1835)

References

 
Sweden
Years of the 20th century in Sweden